The 3000 and 5000 metres distances for women in the 2008–09 ISU Speed Skating World Cup were contested over six races on six occasions, out of a total of nine World Cup occasions for the season, with the first occasion taking place in Berlin, Germany, on 7–9 November 2008, and the final occasion taking place in Salt Lake City, United States, on 6–7 March 2009.

Martina Sáblíková of the Czech Republic successfully defended her title from the previous season, while Daniela Anschütz-Thoms of Germany came second, and Kristina Groves of Canada came third.

Top three

Race medallists

Final standings
Standings as of 7 March 2009 (end of the season).

References

Women 3000
ISU